The candela is a unit of luminous intensity.

Candela may also refer to:

Places
 Candela, Apulia, comune in the Province of Foggia, Italy
 Candela Municipality, municipio in Coahuila, Mexico
 Candela, Coahuila, community in Coahuila State, Mexico
 Candela River, tributary of the Rio Salado, Mexico
Candelas, Colorado, a planned community in Arvada, Colorado, United States

People

Association football
 Candela Andújar (born 2000), Spanish football forward
 Candela (footballer) (born 1987), Spanish footballer
 Álvaro Giménez Candela (born 1991), Spanish footballer
 Antonio Candela (born 2000), Italian professional footballer
 Iván Menéndez Candela (born 1978), Spanish retired footballer 
 Paco Candela (born 1993), Spanish footballer 
 Vincent Candela (born 1973), former French footballer
 Vincenzo Candela (born 1994), Colombian footballer

Others
 Candela Ferro (born 1973), Argentine journalist, model, and television host
 Candela Peña (born 1973), Spanish actress
 Candela Vetrano (born 1991), Argentine actress, singer and model
 Estrella Cabeza Candela (born 1987), Spanish professional tennis player
 Félix Candela (1910-1997), Spanish architect
 Hilario Candela (1934-2022), Cuban-born American architect
 Rosario Candela, Italian born American architect

Music

Bands 
 Candela (American band)
 Candela (Swedish band)
 Candelas (band), Welsh band

Albums and songs 
 Candela (album), 2019
 "Candela", the album's title track
 Candela, a 2013 album by Mice Parade
 "Candela", a song by Bad Gyal from Worldwide Angel
 "Candela", a song by Buena Vista Social Club from Buena Vista Social Club
 "Candela", a song from Chiquititas Vol. 5
 "Candela", a song by Chayanne from Simplemente
 "Candela", a song by Noelia from Noelia

Other uses 
 Candela (tobacco), type of tobacco
 Candela Corp, American medical laser company
 Candela Hotel & Residences, a proposed skyscraper in Seattle, which was never built
 Candela, the leader of Team Valor in the mobile game Pokémon Go

See also 
 Caldera (disambiguation)